Zantop International Airlines, Inc.,  was a United States airline incorporated in May 1972 as a Michigan corporation, the stock of which was 100% owned by the Zantop family.

History
Zantop traces its origins to 1946 when the Zantop family set up Zantop Flying Service. In 1952 it was granted a license for commercial flying: The name was changed to Zantop Air Transport and the company operated as a freight airline for the auto industry. Aircraft like the piston-engined Curtiss C-46 of World War II fame launched Zantop's fleet. Later, in the 1960s, the Armstrong Whitworth Argosy and Douglas DC-6 were added.

In 1962 Zantop took over Coastal Airlines and, through the purchase, acquired a license to carry passengers as well as freight.

In 1967 the Zantop family sold the airline and it became Universal Airlines.  This venture went bankrupt in 1972 and the Zantop family restarted operations under "Zantop International Airlines", based at Willow Run Airport near Detroit, Michigan. Some of the operations were based in Flint, Michigan.

From 1972 to 1978 Zantop flew the DC-6, the Lockheed L-188 Electra, the Convair CV-640 and several Douglas DC-8 freighters.  In 1978 DC-8s were also used for passenger charter flights. In 1978 Zantop also purchased the freight division of Hawaiian Airlines and with it came more Electras. By this time Zantop was one of the largest airlines in the freight business. ZIA had an oversized cargo hub at Ypsilanti, Michigan that served major cities throughout America on a weeknight basis. 

In the late 1980s Duane Zantop's son Jimmy took over after Duane experienced physical problems. Duane Zantop is credited with building the business while his son Jimmy Zantop is remembered for cautiously expanding opportunities globally.  Both are credited with recognizing the unique opportunities created by the airline's rare certificates which allowed it to operate globally with very few political restrictions.

In 1994 the pilots of Zantop voted to join the Teamsters union primarily known for organizing auto workers. Partially in response Zantop created a dedicated FAR Part 125 Certificate that could operate without unionized pilots but this was insufficient to save the airline from the rapidly evolving air freight industry and competition from much larger UPS and FedEx. In the early 2000s Zantop surrendered their operating certificates to the FAA, sold their aging aircraft   and ceased operations.

Freight contracts 
ZIA contracted to serve the automotive industry on demand and served it very well for decades. When an automotive production line was not going to get a shipment of assembly parts on time ZIA would be called to fly automobile parts from a subassembly production line to a major production line due to the economics of shutting down unionized labor assembly facilities. 

Other contracts during this period included:

 Channel Express (callsign ChanEx) starting December 1989 and continuing into 1997 and possibly later initially operating from Stansted, England later expanding to Edinburgh, Scotland
 US postal contracts at Christmas with hubs at various bases
 Roadway Global from its Terre Haute, Indiana hub 
 Fred Olsen's Shipping Line of Norway for DHL Copenhagen, Denmark
 Lynden Air Cargo of Alaska including general freight and US Postal Service subcontracts
 United States military including domestic USAF Log Air and USN Quick Trans and overseas flights
 Contracts with FEMA that provided hurricane damage response to the Caribbean

In the 1990s Zantop continued the military LogAir Contract until its expiration in late 1991. These routes were well served by Zantop - their best on-time performer (at least on paper) serving many military bases from coast to coast. Electra hubs for this contract included Robins AFB in Warner Robins, Georgia and Hill AFB in Ogden, Utah; the Convair was flown through Dayton, Ohio and points north. 

ZIA began its overseas Electra L-188 contracts with Channel Express of Bournemouth, England in the latter part of 1989.  Contracts included flying fresh flowers  and newspapers from inland England to the English Channel Islands of Jersey and Guernsey. Additional contracts included Her Majesty's Mail and Parcel Post, UPS and occasionally FEDEX. UPS was flown initially from Southend at the mouth of the River Thames to Cologne, Germany. From Cologne (Köln) ZIA flew to Zaragosa, Spain. 

In Alaska ZIA contracted with Lynden Air Cargo flying Electra L-188s. The US Postmaster was known to come on board to postmark freight being transported from Anchorage to the outback. The Electra was known to carry 30,000 pounds of frozen fish back to Anchorage. Points served in Alaska included Anchorage, Bethel, Aniak, St. Mary's, Dillingham, King Salmon, Nome, Kotzebue, Kodiak, and several other cities.

ZIA also contracted with the Norwegian shipping and air cargo carrier Fred Olsen Shipping Company to fly DHL contracts from Copenhagen, Denmark to Nuremberg, Germany and on to Bergamo, Italy. The following day the route was retraced adding Billund, Denmark on the return trip. Sunday afternoons provided a daylight flight over the German, Italian, and Swiss Alps.

Fleet
10 - Douglas DC-3 from 1953 to 1969.
6 - Douglas DC-4 from 1959 to 1965.  
8 - Douglas DC-6
25 - Lockheed L-188 Electra
6 - Convair CV-640
18 - Douglas DC-8 (DC-8-21; DC-8-33(F); DC-8-54(F); DC-8-62(CF))

Zantop also operated a Grumman Gulfstream I.

See also 
 List of defunct airlines of the United States

References

External links

Zantop pictures

Defunct airlines of the United States
Airlines established in 1972
Airlines disestablished in 2005
1972 establishments in Michigan
2005 disestablishments in Michigan